Epermenia infracta is a moth in the family Epermeniidae. It was described by Annette Frances Braun in 1926. It is found in North America, where it has been recorded from Alberta, Colorado, Oregon and California.

Taxonomy
The species was previously treated as a synonym of Epermenia strictella.

References

Epermeniidae
Moths described in 1926
Moths of North America